Grand Mosque Allahabad is a mosque in Kandiaro, Naushahro Feroze District, Sindh, Pakistan. It is located on National Highway  from Karachi. Allahabad Mosque premises, houses an education system up till Islamic University level, hospital, old age residence and an orphanage. All structures within the premises are equipped with appropriate facilities for visitors.

Patronage
Khwaja Muhammad Tahir Bakhshi Naqshbandi (Urdu: حضرت خواجہ محمد طاہر بخشی نقشبندی,), also known as Sajjan Saeen (Urdu: سجن سائیں, Sindhi: سڄڻ سائين), is a prominent Naqshbandi Sufi shaykh in Pakistan is main patron of masjid.

Architecture
The inspiration of Grand Mosque Allahabad has been drawn from the most traditional Islamic architectural sites. Preserving hand painted tile (Kashi) heritage of Indus valley civilization while utilizing the most advanced technology of fair-finish concrete.

The mosque consists of 101 domes. The domes and the sole minaret denote the main design of the mosque.

Finish
Allahabad Mosque is unique in design incorporating fair finish concrete structure with the combination of hand painted porcelain tile work. 
floral patterns have been preferred over geometric designs which require inch by inch details to transfer them on porcelain tiles.

A group of senior artists volunteered to set up a production unit to use all available resources utilizing hand painting techniques, selection of colours, firing process to create master pieces of kashi tiles. They have been producing kashi tiles for the past 12 years and continue to produce signature designs, floral and calligraphic patterns on Kashi tiles to adorn Grand Mosque Allahabad. They deserve appreciation for the remarkable dedication for creating exclusive patterns for use in Allahabad Mosque.

Gallery

See also 
List of mosques in Pakistan

References 

Mosques in Sindh
Allahabad